AJA University of Medical Sciences is the medical school of Islamic Republic of Iran Army (Artesh), located in Tehran. The university enrolls top students of Iranian University Entrance Exam, who are given the rank of First lieutenant upon graduation in PhD.

References 

Educational institutions established in 1993
1993 establishments in Iran
Islamic Republic of Iran Army
Medical schools in Iran
Military education and training in Iran
Military medical installations